Nightshade is the common name for plants in the genus Solanum, and more generally for related plants in the family Solanaceae.

Nightshade(s) or Night Shade(s) may also refer to:

Other plants 
 Enchanter's nightshade, any of the plants in the genus Circaea, in the willowherb family Onagraceae

Art, entertainment, and media

Fictional entities
 Nightshade (DC Comics), a comic book superheroine published by DC Comics
 Nightshade (Dungeons & Dragons), a type of monster in Dungeons & Dragons
 Nightshade (Marvel Comics), also known as Dr. Nightshade and Deadly Nightshade, a comic book super-villain in the Marvel Universe
 James "Jim" Nightshade, a character from the novel Something Wicked This Way Comes
 A character in the Magic Kingdom of Landover stories by Terry Brooks
 A character from the animated television program C.O.P.S.

Literature
 Nightshade (Butler novel), a 1989 science fiction novel by Jack Butler
 Nightshade (Gatiss novel), a 1992 Doctor Who novel by Mark Gatiss
 Nightshades: Thirteen Journeys Into Shadow, an anthology of dark fantasy/horror short stories by Tanith Lee
 Night Shade, a 1976 book by Dorothy Daniels and illustrated by Hector Garrido
 Night Shade: Gothic Tales by Women, a 1999 novel edited by Victoria Brownworth & Judith Redding, which earned them Lambda Literary Awards
 "Night Shades", a short story in Donna Andrews' Meg Langslow series
 Nightshade (Horowitz novel), the thirteenth book in the Alex Rider series by Anthony Horowitz

Music 
 Night Shade (album), a 2014 album by Lanie Lane
 Night Shades, a 2011 album by Cobra Starship
 "Nightshade", a song by Mike Oldfield from the 2005 album Light + Shade

Video games 
 Nightshade (1985 video game), a video game by Ultimate Play The Game
 Nightshade (1992 video game), a video game for the Nintendo Entertainment System
 Nightshade (2003 video game), a video game for the PlayStation 2

Other art, entertainment, and media
 Night Shade, a 1997 film by Fred Olen Ray
 Night Shade, a work choreographed by Ulysses Dove

Other uses 
 Night Shade Books, an American publisher
 Nightshade (astronomy software)
 Judy Simpson, nicknamed "Nightshade" in the UK TV show Gladiators